Yoo Se-rye (born Yoo Hee-jeong on March 16, 1984) is a South Korean actress.

Filmography

Television series

Film

References

External links

Yoo Se-rye at Daum 

South Korean film actresses
South Korean television actresses
1984 births
Living people
Seoul Institute of the Arts alumni
21st-century South Korean actresses
South Korean television personalities